French Polynesia competed as Tahiti at the 2019 Pacific Games in Apia, Samoa from 7 to 20 July 2019. The country participated in 21 sports at the 2019 games.

Archery

Athletics

Badminton

Tahiti qualified seven players in badminton for the 2019 games.

Men
 Rauhiri Goguenheim
 Manuarii Ly
 Remi Rossi

Women
 Heinamu Frogier
 Hinahere Mara
 Melissa Mi You
 Esther Tau

Basketball

5x5

Men's basketball
 TBC

Women's basketball
 TBC

3x3

Men
 TBC

Women
 TBC

Boxing

Cricket

Football

Men's football

Squad
TBC

Women's football

Squad
TBC

Golf

Tahiti qualified eight players for the 2019 tournament:

Women
 Vaea Nauta
 Maggy Dury
 Flavia Reid-Amaru
 Moea Simon 

Men
 Matahiapo Wohler
 Jeremy Biau
 Nicolas Changarnier
 Ari De Maeyer

Judo

Lawn bowls

Netball

Outrigger canoeing

Powerlifting

Rugby league nines

Men's rugby league
 TBC

Women's rugby league
 TBC

Rugby sevens

Men's sevens

Women's sevens

Sailing

Shooting

Squash

Swimming

Table tennis

Taekwondo

Tennis

Touch rugby

Triathlon

Volleyball

Beach volleyball

Volleyball (Indoor)

Weightlifting

Tahiti selected nine athletes (six men and three women) in weighlifing at the 2019 games.

Men
 Joackim Ah Scha;  -105 kg
 Mahei Oopa: -74 kg
 Marc Lisan: -83 kg
 Miguel Hopuetai: -93 kg
 Kevin Boukansan: -120 kg
 François Lanteres: + 120 kg

Women
 Heilani Sao Yao: -63 kg
 Vaitiare Sham Koua: -84 kg
 Sandra Pratz: -57 kg

References

Nations at the 2019 Pacific Games
2019